is a type of Japanese pottery traditionally from Sado, Niigata.

External links 
 http://www.city.sado.niigata.jp/sadobunka/denbun/bunkazai/sado_city/mukei/city_no122.htm

Culture in Niigata Prefecture
Japanese pottery